OPV-70  is an Offshore Patrol Vessel of the Royal Moroccan Navy, designed by Raidco Marine and built at STX France SA.

The first vessel received, was named after the Battle of Bir Anzaran, between the Polisario Front and Royal Armed Forces in 1979.

Definition of the Equipment and requirements
The main mission is the surveillance of Moroccan EEZ and control of fisheries in the Atlantic Ocean, with secondary roles including detecting illegal immigration, smuggling and drug trafficking and supporting counter terrorism and search and rescue patrols along Moroccan coasts.

Bir Anzaran is the first in a series, which will include three more units: P342, P343 and P344 with an option for two more. The Moroccan EM (Etat Major) now discuss the purchase of a more sophisticated and advanced version for the three last ships to be built.

Its hull is made of steel and aluminum structures, for a displacement of 800 tonnes with a maximum speed of 22 knots.

It received its weapons at the port of Casablanca:

 x1 Otobreda 76 mm
 x1 Bofors 40mm
 2 x 14,5 mm MG
 2 x 12,7 mm MG

Ships

References

Patrol vessels of Morocco
Patrol boat classes